Charles E. Sydnor III (born March 18, 1974) is an American politician who represents district 44 in the Maryland Senate and who previously represented district 44B in the Maryland House of Delegates.

Background
Sydnor grew up in the West Hills section of Baltimore City and graduated from the Baltimore Polytechnic Institute high school in 1992.  In 1996, after four years of college, he earned a bachelor's degree in history from Johns Hopkins University.  He simultaneously earned a master's degree from the University of Maryland Baltimore County in policy science and a Juris Doctor from University of Maryland School of Law, both being awarded in 2000.

Sydnor served as a law clerk for the Honorable William D. Quarles in the Circuit Court for Baltimore City.  Thereafter, in 2001, he began his legal career as staff attorney with Enterprise Community Partners, Inc.

Maryland State Delegate
Delegate Sydnor was sworn in on January 14, 2015, and assigned to the House Judiciary Committee and to that committee's Civil Law and Procedure and Criminal Justice subcommittees.  Later that year, he also served on the Commission for Body-worn Cameras and was appointed to the National Conference of State Legislatures’ Law, Criminal Justice and Public Safety Committee.

In 2016, he was appointed to the Legislative Black Caucus of Maryland's Executive Board as its Parliamentarian.

On January 11, 2017, he was named chair of the Civil Law and Procedure subcommittee.

Policing reform
In 2015, Sydnor was the primary sponsor of HB533 (Public Safety - Law Enforcement Officers - Body-Worn Digital Recording Device and Electronic Control Device), a law enabling Maryland police officers to use body-worn cameras and Baltimore City and Baltimore County - Police Behavioral Health Units - Pilot Program, which established behavioral health units consisting of specially trained officers who are to identify individuals with mental health and/or substance use disorders.

Privacy
In 2019, Sydnor introduced HB30 to restrict police from accessing consumer genealogical databases to identify criminal suspects through DNA samples submitted by relatives. He introduced his bill after a suspect was arrested in the Golden State Killer murders by police who used a consumer DNA database to identify him.

Maryland State Senator
On December 30, 2019, Maryland governor Larry Hogan announced the appointment of Sydnor to the state Senate seat left vacant with the retirement of Shirley Nathan-Pulliam. He took office on January 8, 2020.

References

External links
 

Democratic Party Maryland state senators
African-American state legislators in Maryland
1974 births
Living people
Politicians from Baltimore
Johns Hopkins University alumni
Baltimore Polytechnic Institute alumni
21st-century American politicians
21st-century African-American politicians
20th-century African-American people